is a former Japanese football player.

Club statistics

References

External links

Football News

1984 births
Living people
Biwako Seikei Sport College alumni
Association football people from Nagano Prefecture
Japanese footballers
J2 League players
J3 League players
Japan Football League players
Matsumoto Yamaga FC players
Blaublitz Akita players
MIO Biwako Shiga players
Association football midfielders